Gillock Island is an ice-covered island,  long and  wide,  with numerous rock outcrops exposed along its flanks.  It is aligned north–south and lies in the eastern part of Amery Ice Shelf.

Delineated in 1952 by John H. Roscoe from air photos taken by U.S. Navy Operation Highjump (1946–47).  Named by him for Lieutenant Robert A. Gillock, U.S. Navy, navigator on Operation Highjump photographic flights over this and other coastal areas between 14°E and 164°E.

The Bain Crags are a number of rock exposures, many of which are banded, in the face of or projecting from the ice cliffs along the south part of the west side of Gillock Island. The feature was visited in January 1969 by J.H.C. Bain, geologist with the Australian National Antarctic Research Expeditions Prince Charles Mountains survey party, after whom it is named.

See also 
 Composite Antarctic Gazetteer
 List of Antarctic and sub-Antarctic islands
 List of Antarctic islands south of 60° S
 SCAR
 Territorial claims in Antarctica

Further reading 
 R. L. Oliver, P. R. James, J. B. Jago, Antarctic Earth Science, P 444
 DK, Reference World Atlas, P 195
 R.J. TINGEY, GEOLOGICAL INVESTIGATIONS IN ANTARCTICA 1968-1969: THE PRYDZ BAY - AMERY ICE SHELF - PRINCE CHARLES MOUNTAINS AREA, Bureau of Mineral Resources, Geology and Geophysics

References

External links
 Gillock Island USGS site
 Gillock Island AADC site
  Gillock Island SCAR site
 Satellite image
 long term whether forecast 

Islands of Mac. Robertson Land